Agata Biernat (born 1989) is a Polish beauty pageant titleholder who won the Miss Polonia 2017. she represented Poland at the Miss World 2018 pageant in China, in December.

Personal life
Biernat lives in Zduńska Wola, Poland.  She has been involved in dance and sport since childhood, since she was a child she trained dance and athletics . She is a dance instructor in many dance styles, including pole dance, as well as fitness instructor and personal trainer. Biernat started to compete at Miss Polonia in 2009. She was placing as the First Runner-up while Maria Nowakowska won the title and competed at the Miss Universe 2010 in Las Vegas. In 2017 she finally won the national title.

The Miss Polonia Organization was recently granted the rights to send the Polish contestant to Miss World (their last year was 2006).  Agata was chosen to represent Poland and was officially crowned Miss World Poland 2018 in a small ceremony.  Since the Miss World and Miss Universe pageants conflict in terms of dates, the new Miss Polonia 2018 will compete in Miss World.

Achievements
Miss Polonia 2017.

References

External links
misspolonia.com.pl
missuniverse.com
agatabiernat.com

Living people
1989 births
Miss World 2018 delegates